Balcom is a surname. Notable people with the surname include:

Bruce Balcom, Canadian scientist 
Eric Balcom (1910–1989), businessman and political figure in Nova Scotia, Canada
Henry Balcom (1804–1882), shipbuilder and political figure in Nova Scotia
Homer G. Balcom (1870–1938), American structural engineer
Lannie Balcom (1941–1991), stage name for Linda K. Balcom, an American model, actress and Playboy Playmate of the Month
Samuel Rosborough Balcom (1888–1981), Canadian politician, businessman and pharmacist

See also
Balcom and Vaughan Pipe Organ, Inc., a builder of pipe organs based in Seattle